Nicola Borghetto (born 25 November 1999) is an Italian footballer who plays for  club Fermana as a goalkeeper.

Club career
He started his senior career in Serie D with Liventina and Belluno.

On 7 July 2017, he was signed by the Serie A club Verona, initially on loan, and assigned to their Under-19 squad. He appeared as the back-up with the senior squad twice in the 2017–18 season, once in Serie A and once in Coppa Italia.

For the 2018–19 season, he was loaned to Serie D club Mantova.

On 29 June 2019, he signed his first professional contract with Verona for a 3-year term. On 2 September 2019, he was loaned to Bisceglie in Serie C.

He made his professional Serie C debut for Bisceglie on 24 November 2019 in a game against Paganese. He started the game and played the whole match.

On 26 August 2021, he joined Monterosi on loan.

On 1 September 2022, Borghetto signed with Fermana.

References

External links
 

1999 births
Sportspeople from the Metropolitan City of Venice
Living people
Italian footballers
Association football goalkeepers
A.C. Belluno 1905 players
Hellas Verona F.C. players
Mantova 1911 players
A.S. Bisceglie Calcio 1913 players
Monterosi Tuscia F.C. players
Fermana F.C. players
Serie C players
Serie D players
Footballers from Veneto